These are the official results of the Men's Decathlon competition at the 1987 World Championships in Rome, Italy. There were a total number of 28 participating athletes, including ten non-finishers. The competition started on September 3, 1987, and ended on September 4, 1987.

Medalists

Schedule
Thursday, September 3

Friday, September 4

Records

Final

See also
 1986 Men's European Championships Decathlon
 1987 Hypo-Meeting
 1988 Men's Olympic Decathlon

References
 Results
 Results

D
Decathlon at the World Athletics Championships